Aleksandr Vladimirovich Nadolsky (born 9 April 2001) is a Russian football player who plays for FC Murom.

Club career
He made his debut in the Russian Professional Football League for FC Chertanovo-2 Moscow on 18 July 2018 in a game against FC Murom.

He made his Russian Football National League for FC Chertanovo Moscow on 12 October 2019 in a game against FC Avangard Kursk.

References

External links
 

2001 births
People from Kansk
Sportspeople from Krasnoyarsk Krai
Living people
Russian footballers
Russia youth international footballers
Association football defenders
Association football midfielders
FC Chertanovo Moscow players
FC Yenisey Krasnoyarsk players
Russian First League players
Russian Second League players